St Michael's Church, Bray, is a Grade II* listed parish church in the Church of England in Bray, Berkshire.

History

The church dates from 1293, supposedly to replace a Saxon church at Water Oakley.

It was partly rebuilt ca. 1500 and extensively restored 1857–82 by Thomas Henry Wyatt.

It has a number of sculptures which may have come from the earlier church, including a damaged Sheela na Gig.

The ecclesiastical parish shares the wide parish boundaries so is named Bray St Michael with Braywoodside.

Monuments

The church contains several brasses from the fourteenth to sixteenth centuries, notably that of  1378 to Sir John Foxley, the Constable of Southampton Castle. Other monuments are: 
William Goddard of Philibert, d.1609, founder of Jesus Hospital, and Joyce Maunsell his wife, d.1622.
Mary Hanger (d.1738) sculpted by Peter Scheemakers.

Vicars of Bray

See The Vicar of Bray for the satirical description, or The Vicar of Bray (song) for the English folk song.

Reinbald 1081
Roger 1288
Henry de Chilbalton 1301
Roger de Crossby 1327
William Scherreve 1368–75
John Dray 1382
Thomas Gernon 1382–96
William Dyer 1396–1440
Robert Manfelde 1440–43
Thomas Pashe 1443–44
Thomas Topclyf 1444
Thomas Luyde 1444–54
William Morris 1454–79
Thomas Phillippis 1479–97
John Perkwyn 1497
John Halle 1504
Richard Watts 1504–20
John Mogeryge 1521–23
Simon Symonds 1523–47
William Stafferton 1548–55
Alexander Barlo 1556
Simon Aleyn 1557–65
Henry Cranshawe 1565
David Tuke 1589–99
Edward Cranceshaw 1599
Edward Boughton 1621–40
Anthony Faringdon 1640–42
Hezekiah Woodward 1649–60
Edward Boughton 1660
Edward Fulham 1660–62
Francis Carswell 1665–1709
Thomas Brown 1709–59
George Berkeley 1759–69
Hon George Hamilton 1769–87
Edward Townshend 1787–1822
Walter Levett 1822–25
George Legge 1825–26
Walter Levett 1826–53
James Austen Leigh 1853–74
William Brassey Hole 1874–87
Charles Raymond 1887–1915
William Riddelsdell 1915–31
Arthur Jones 1931–45
Edward Lowman 1945–58
Sidney Doran 1958–77
Neil Howells 1977–84
George Repath 1985–2007
Richard Cowles 2008

References

Church of England church buildings in Berkshire
Grade II* listed churches in Berkshire
St Michael's Church